Schoolgirl(s) may refer to:

"Schoolgirl" (song), a 1986 song by Kim Wilde
School Girl (film), a 1971 pornographic film directed by Paul Gerber
Schoolgirls (film), a 2020 Spanish drama film
The Schoolgirl, a 1920s–1940s British girls' story paper
The School Girl, a 1903 British musical

See also
School Gyrls, an American pop quintet
 Schoolgirl uniform fetish
 Single-sex education
 Student